Katherine, Katharine, Kathryn or Kathy Williams may refer to:

Katharine Isabella Williams (1848–1917), British chemist
Kath Williams (1895–1975), Australian women's activist
Katharine Williams, Australian judge
Kathryn Williams (born 1974), English singer-songwriter
Kathy Williams, a character in The Fog

See also
Catharine R. Williams (1787–1872), American writer and suffragist
Kathryn Harby-Williams (born 1969), Australian netball player and television presenter
Katherine Dienes (born 1970), also known as Katherine Dienes-Williams, a New Zealand-born organist and conductor
Katie Williams (disambiguation)
Kate Williams (disambiguation)
Williams (surname)